T. T. Boy (born April 30, 1968) is an American pornographic performer and podcaster. He made his 
adult video debut in 1988.

He twice won the XRCO Male Performer of the Year award, and was named the 1997 AVN Performer of the Year. In 2000, he was elected to the XRCO Hall of Fame. In 2003, he was inducted into the AVN Hall of Fame. He has worked under such names as T.T. Boyd, Max Reynolds, Max Cash, and Butch.

Within the business, he is known as an untiring performer. In a 2015 interview, he stated that over the course of his career, he has slept with over 10,000 women.

Since 2019, Boy has hosted TT Boy TV, a podcast featuring interviews with current and former porn performers. The show is available on YouTube and Spotify.

Awards
1992 – Adult Video News Award Best Group Sex Scene – Video (Realities 2, Ashlyn Gere, Marc Wallice and T.T. Boy)
1993 – AVN Best Couples Sex Scene – Video (Bikini Beach, Sierra and T.T. Boy)
1995 – XRCO Best Couples Scene (Seymore and Shane on the Loose!, T.T. Boy and Lana)
1996 – AVN Best Couples Sex Scene – Film (Blue Movie, Jenna Jameson and T.T. Boy)
1996 – XRCO Male Performer of the Year
1996 – XRCO Woodsman of the Year
1997 – XRCO Male Performer of the Year
1997 – XRCO Best Anal or D.P. Scene (Car Wash Angels, Careena Collins, T.T. Boy and Tom Byron)
1997 – AVN Male Performer of the Year
1997 – AVN Most Outrageous Sex Scene (Shock, Shayla LaVeaux, T.T. Boy and Vince Vouyer)
1999 – XRCO Best Male-Female Scene (Pink Hotel on Butt Row, T.T. Boy and Elena)
2000 – XRCO Hall of Fame inductee
2003 – AVN Hall of Fame inductee
2009 – Urban X Hall of Fame inductee

References

External links
 
 
 
 

1968 births
Living people
American people of Puerto Rican descent
American male pornographic film actors
Hispanic and Latino American pornographic film actors
Pornographic film actors from New York (state)